Maamar Bengriba (born 26 October 1985) is an Algerian long-distance runner.

In 2018, he competed in the men's half marathon at the 2018 IAAF World Half Marathon Championships held in Valencia, Spain. He finished in 74th place. He also competed in the men's half marathon at the 2018 Mediterranean Games held in Tarragona, Spain. He finished in 13th place.

References

External links 
 

Living people
1985 births
Place of birth missing (living people)
Algerian male long-distance runners
Athletes (track and field) at the 2018 Mediterranean Games
Mediterranean Games competitors for Algeria
21st-century Algerian people
20th-century Algerian people